CBL Munchee Bangladesh is a flagship biscuit brand of Ceylon Biscuits Limited (CBL) in Bangladesh. CBL, the mother company with 50 years of experience and is present in 64 countries, entered Bangladesh in 2014 by setting up a factory in Sreepur Upazila, Gazipur,  from Dhaka as the first Sri Lankan owned confectionery manufacturing plant in Bangladesh, and the first Sri Lankan owned confectionery manufacturing plant overseas. The plant was set up as it was cheaper to manufacture in Bangladesh than exporting large volumes there due to high duties on confectionery imports. With the plant CBL planned to export Munchee to Nepal and Bhutan, and eventually to Europe and Persian Gulf countries from the Bangladesh plant as Bangladesh is had significant concessions on its exports.

CBL Munchee started marketing in Bangladesh in 2015. By 2019, Munchee was available in 55 countries. CBL has an agreement with Concord Entertainment Co. Ltd to showcase Munchee at Fantasy Kingdom.

Awards
On the Mothers Day of 2017, Munchee and The Daily Star organised social media initiative "Mayer Daka Naam" (lit. the name my mother calls me by) to post that name on Facebook, a campaign that was awarded Best Digital Advertising Campaign and Best in Social Media Engagement awards at South Asian Digital Media Awards 2017 jointly presented by World Association of Newspapers and News Publishers (WAN-IFRA) and Google. Bangladeshi major social media influencers like Ayman Sadiq, Solaiman Shukhon, Zara Mahbub, and Arif R Hossain were among those who posted their names of affection on Facebook on that Mother's Day.

AsiaOne magazine and United Research Services declared Munchee as the Fastest Growing Brand in Bangladesh in 2018.

Award list

Variants
Munchee has multiple variants.

References

Biscuit brands
Food and drink companies of Bangladesh